II is the second studio album by the American country music duo The Kinleys. It was released in 2000 (see 2000 in country music) as their second and final album for Epic Records.

Background
The Kinleys worked with the producers of their debut album, Russ Zavitson and Tony Haselden, for their follow-up album, and released the single "My Heart Is Still Beating" in July 1999. The single, however, failed to reach the Country top 40, and the album, which was to be self-titled and released on October 6, 1999, was put on hold by Epic Records, who decided to bring in Country artist Radney Foster to produce songs on the album in order to broaden the duo's sound and regain chart appeal. In the end, half of the album was produced by Foster and the other half by Zavitson and Haselden.

The record includes two songs co-written by Jennifer Kinley's husband, Adam Hughes, and also has the first lead vocal performance of Jennifer Kinley in a Kinleys song on "I Need You Now", the duo's usual way of singing consisting of Heather Kinley on lead with Jennifer on harmony vocals. The duo recorded a song titled "If I Can Only Win Your Love" with Vince Gill, but it was ultimately not used on the album as they felt it wasn't good enough.

"My Heart Is Still Beating" was eventually not included on the album and the first single, the Foster-produced "She Ain't The Girl For You" was released in the Spring of 2000. It peaked at #34 in the Country charts.

The next single, "I'm In" peaked at #35 in the Country charts. It was previously a single in 1998 for Foster from his album See What You Want to See, and was covered by Keith Urban on his 2009 album Defying Gravity. Also included on II is "Somebody's Out There Watching", a Top 20 hit for The Kinleys in 1998, which was previously included on the television soundtrack for the series Touched by an Angel.

Track listing

Personnel
Compiled from liner notes.

Tracks 1-6
 Sam Bush — fiddle
 Chad Cromwell — drums
 Steve Fishell — pedal steel guitar, Dobro, Weissenborn
 Pat Flynn — acoustic guitar
 Tony Harrell — keyboards
 Byron House — bass guitar
 Craig Krampf — percussion
 James Maddox — keyboards
 Dennis Matkotsky — keyboards
 Michael McAdam — electric guitar
 Joe Pisapia — electric guitar
 Chely Wright - background vocals on "She Ain't the Girl for You"

Tracks 7-13
 Joe Chemay — bass guitar
 Shannon Forrest — drums, percussion
 Larry Franklin — fiddle
 Sonny Garrish — steel guitar, Dobro
 John Hobbs — synthesizer
 Jerry Kimbrough — acoustic guitar, bouzouki
 Marc Kunkel — harmonica
 Steve Nathan — piano, Hammond B-3 organ
 Michael Rhodes — bass guitar
 Brent Rowan — electric guitar
 Mitchell Shedd — percussion
 Biff Watson — acoustic guitar, bouzouki
 John Willis — electric guitar, banjo

Strings on "If Ever I Needed You"
 Anthony LaMarchina, John Catchings — cello
 David Davidson, Conni Ellisor, Mary Kathryn VanOsdale, David Angell — violins

Strings arranged by John Darnell.

Tracks 1-6 produced by Radney Foster; tracks 7-13 produced by Tony Haselden and Russ Zavitson.

Chart performance

References

2000 albums
Epic Records albums
The Kinleys albums